Pholcus nagasakiensis is a species of cellar spider in the genus Pholcus. It is found in Japan.

See also 

 List of Pholcidae species

References 

Endemic fauna of Japan
Taxa named by Embrik Strand
Spiders described in 1916
Pholcidae